Augustine Heard & Co. was a major nineteenth-century American trading firm in Qing dynasty China whose operations consisted in importing and exporting a large array of goods, including tea and opium.

History and leadership
Augustine Heard and Co. was founded in 1840, in Canton, China by Ipswich, Massachusetts, businessman, traveller, trader and former Russell & Co. partner Augustine Heard, and his partners, Joseph Coolidge and George Basil Dixwell. Throughout its history, it was run in large part by Heard family members, most notably Heard's four nephews from his brother George Washington Heard: John, Augustine, Albert Farley and George Washington Jr.

In 1841, Augustine Heard, who had previously lived in China but had returned for health reasons to Ipswich, returned to China to head the firm until 1844. There, business flourished, notably because of the use of fast clipper ships and the import of steamships. Tea, one of the main commodities traded, did not provide much profit compared to opium, which enabled the firm's finances to soar, Augustine Heard & Co. becoming the third largest American firm in China in the mid-nineteenth century. The firm also introduced steamships to China, and imported them through its sister firm in the U.S. The firm also became the main trading agent for several large firms, including Liverpool firm John Swire & Sons Limited. in 1861.

In 1844, Heard began travelling extensively, and handed control over the firm to his partners. Among Heard's partners, his four nephews we most active and ably directed the firm. John Heard led the firm until his departure in 1852; Augustine Heard II then took over the leadership of the firm and became the first Westerner permitted to trade in Siam in 1855. When his brother John returned to take the leadership again, the younger Augustine became the firm's representative to Europe. Albert Farley later took over the firm and, finally, George Washington Jr. who remained in China until the firm's collapse.

The firm prospered until the 1870s when, just like its rivals, it encountered financial difficulties, and finally went bankrupt in 1875.

United States 
A sister company bearing the same name operated between April 13, 1861, and April 9, 1865, in the business of "buying and shipping steamers for China, receiving merchandise from China, and selling the same, and insuring merchandise and vessels."

Notable partners 
Joseph Coolidge, trader
George B. Dixwell, New England merchant
John Murray Forbes, American railroad magnate
Augustine Heard, founder
Augustine Heard II, later U.S. Minister to Korea
John Heard
Albert Farley Heard
George Washington Jr.

See also

 List of trading companies

References

External links
The Phillips Library at the Peabody Essex Museum  The Phillips Library holds several manuscript collections of Augustine Heard and Company and various family members.

Archives and records
Heard Family Business records at Baker Library Historical Collections, Harvard Business School.
Augustine Heard & Company invoices and receipts at Baker Library Special Collections, Harvard Business School.

British Hong Kong
Companies established in 1840
History of foreign trade in China
History of Hong Kong
Trading companies of the United States
Defunct companies of the United States
Defunct companies of China
1840 establishments in China
Companies disestablished in 1875
1875 disestablishments in China